The Opposition in the Australian state of Western Australia comprises the largest party or coalition of parties not in Government. The Opposition's purpose is to hold the Government to account and constitute a "Government-in-waiting" should the existing Government fall. To that end, a Leader of the Opposition and Shadow Ministers for the various government departments question the Premier and Ministers on Government policy and administration, and formulate the policy the Opposition would pursue in Government. It is sometimes styled "His Majesty's Loyal Opposition" to demonstrate that although it opposes the Government, it remains loyal to the King.

The current Leader of the Opposition is Nationals Leader Mia Davies. The conservative Opposition was previously led by Zak Kirkup of the Liberal Party. In the 2021 election, the Liberal Party ended up winning fewer seats than the National Party, headed by Davies, with the National Party gaining opposition status and Davies becoming the first Nationals opposition leader since 1947.

List of shadow ministries
Tonkin shadow ministry
Jamieson shadow ministry
Ron Davies shadow ministry
Burke shadow ministry
O'Connor shadow ministry
Hassell shadow ministry
MacKinnon shadow ministry
First Court shadow ministry
Lawrence shadow ministry
Taylor shadow ministry
McGinty shadow ministry
Gallop shadow ministry
Second Court shadow ministry
First Barnett shadow ministry
Birney shadow ministry
Omodei shadow ministry
Buswell shadow ministry
Second Barnett shadow ministry
Ripper shadow ministry
McGowan shadow ministry
Nahan shadow ministry
Harvey shadow ministry
Kirkup shadow ministry
Mia Davies shadow ministry

Current arrangement
Following the 2021 election, the Liberal Party and Nationals Party entered into a formal alliance to form opposition, with National Party being the senior party and the Liberal Party being the junior party in the alliance. Shadow ministerial positions were also held by parliamentary members of both parties. This was similar to the agreements between both parties when they were in government following the 2008 and 2013 elections. Similar to the 2008 and 2013 agreements, the deputy leader of the senior party, Nationals deputy leader Shane Love, was the deputy opposition leader, instead of the leader of the junior party, Liberal Party leader David Honey. Under the alliance, each party maintained their independence, and could speak out on issues when there was a disagreement with their partner.

See also
 Opposition (Australia)
 Leader of the Opposition (Western Australia)

References

External links
 Office of the Opposition Alliance

Politics of Western Australia